Farrea omniclavata is a species of sea sponge first found at the bottom of shelf, canyon and seamounts of the west coast of Washington, British Columbia and the Gulf of Alaska.

References

Further reading
Du Preez, C., et al. "Cobb Seamount Species Inventory." Can. Tech. Rep. Fish. Aquat. Sci 3122 (2015).
Curtis, J. M. R., et al. 2012 Expedition to Cobb Seamount: Survey Methods, Data Collections, and Species Observations. 2015.

External links

Hexactinellida
Animals described in 2014